Estado de Minas (abbreviated EM) is a Brazilian newspaper published in the capital of Minas Gerais state, Belo Horizonte. Its foundation dates as late as 1928, and one year later it was bought by Assis Chateaubriand's Diários Associados. EM is the most traditional and respected publication of Minas, and  the highest-selling broadsheet of the state, with a daily average of 83,787 copies through 2012. It is only surpassed in Minas by tabloid Super Notícia, and ranks 14th among all publications of Brazil. It is also considered one of the most important and respected Brazilian newspapers.

References

External links

Daily newspapers published in Brazil
Mass media in Belo Horizonte
Diários Associados
Publications established in 1928
1928 establishments in Brazil